The Joncas River (in French: rivière Joncas) flows entirely in the municipality of Sainte-Louise, in the L'Islet Regional County Municipality, in the administrative region of Chaudière-Appalaches, Quebec, Canada.

The confluence of the Joncas river constitutes the head of the Ferrée River, which flows on  towards the north to go to the south bank of the St. Lawrence River. This last confluence is located in the small hamlet of Village-des-Aulnaies, located southwest of the village of La Pocatière and northeast of the village of Saint-Roch-des-Aulnaies.

Toponymy 
The toponym Joncas was formalized on December 5, 1968, at the Commission de toponymie du Québec.

See also 
 List of rivers of Quebec

References 

Rivers of Chaudière-Appalaches
L'Islet Regional County Municipality